Richard Abbott may refer to:

 Richard Abbott (politician) (1859–1940), Australian politician
 Richard Abbott (One Life to Live), a character from the American soap opera One Life to Live
 Richard Abbott (actor) (1899–1986), born Simon Vandenberg, a Belgian-American actor
 Richard Abbott (swimmer), American swimmer, who in 1975 participated in Swimming at the Pan American Games

See also
 Richard Abbot (1818–1904), English poet
 Richard Atkinson Abbot (1883–1954), New Zealand architect